The year 1795 in architecture involved some significant events.

Buildings and structures

Buildings

 Franklin Place in Boston, Massachusetts, designed by Charles Bulfinch, is completed.
 Old North Building at Georgetown College in Washington, D.C., probably designed by Leonard Harbaugh, is completed.
 Remodelling of Łazienki Palace in Warsaw by Domenico Merlini, begun in 1764, is completed.
 Church of St. Mary Magdalene, Bridgnorth, Shropshire, England, designed by Thomas Telford, is completed.
 The Welsh Bridge in Shrewsbury, Shropshire, England, designed and built by John Tilley and John Carline, is completed.
 Gallowgate Barracks in Glasgow, Scotland, are built.
 The Cabildo in New Orleans (first phase) is started (completed in 1799).

Births
 April 3 – Richard Lane, English architect (died 1880)
 May 23 – Charles Barry, English architect (died 1860)
 October 19 – Thomas Leverton Donaldson, English architect (died 1885)
 Approximate date – John Forbes, English architect working in Cheltenham

Deaths
 June 23 – James Craig, Scottish architect (born 1744)

References

Architecture
Years in architecture
18th-century architecture